The 2005–06 Atlanta Thrashers season was the Thrashers' seventh season in the National Hockey League. The Thrashers again did not qualify for the playoffs.

Offseason
On September 27, 2005, Scott Mellanby was named team captain. Peter Bondra, Bobby Holik, and Vyacheslav Kozlov were named alternate captains, rotating on a game-by-game basis.

Regular season

Final standings

Schedule and results

|- align="center" bgcolor="#FFBBBB"
|1||L||October 5, 2005||0–2 || align="left"| @ Florida Panthers (2005–06) ||0–1–0 || 
|- align="center" bgcolor="#CCFFCC" 
|2||W||October 7, 2005||7–3 || align="left"| @ Washington Capitals (2005–06) ||1–1–0 || 
|- align="center" bgcolor="#CCFFCC" 
|3||W||October 8, 2005||8–1 || align="left"|  Washington Capitals (2005–06) ||2–1–0 || 
|- align="center" bgcolor="#FFBBBB"
|4||L||October 12, 2005||0–2 || align="left"|  Montreal Canadiens (2005–06) ||2–2–0 || 
|- align="center" bgcolor="#FFBBBB"
|5||L||October 14, 2005||1–9 || align="left"|  Toronto Maple Leafs (2005–06) ||2–3–0 || 
|- align="center" bgcolor="#FFBBBB"
|6||L||October 15, 2005||1–5 || align="left"|  @ New York Rangers (2005–06) ||2–4–0 || 
|- align="center" bgcolor="#FFBBBB"
|7||L||October 20, 2005||0–6 || align="left"|  Tampa Bay Lightning (2005–06) ||2–5–0 || 
|- align="center" bgcolor="#CCFFCC" 
|8||W||October 22, 2005||4–3 || align="left"|  New Jersey Devils (2005–06) ||3–5–0 || 
|- align="center" bgcolor="#FFBBBB"
|9||L||October 25, 2005||3–4 || align="left"| @ New York Islanders (2005–06) ||3–6–0 || 
|- align="center" bgcolor="#FFBBBB"
|10||L||October 27, 2005||5–7 || align="left"| @ Pittsburgh Penguins (2005–06) ||3–7–0 || 
|- align="center" bgcolor="#FFBBBB"
|11||L||October 29, 2005||2–3 || align="left"|  Tampa Bay Lightning (2005–06) ||3–8–0 || 
|-

|- align="center" bgcolor="#CCFFCC" 
|12||W||November 1, 2005||6–4 || align="left"| @ Tampa Bay Lightning (2005–06) ||4–8–0 || 
|- align="center" 
|13||L||November 4, 2005||2–3 SO|| align="left"| @ Washington Capitals (2005–06) ||4–8–1 || 
|- align="center" bgcolor="#FFBBBB"
|14||L||November 5, 2005||3–4 || align="left"| @ Philadelphia Flyers (2005–06) ||4–9–1 || 
|- align="center" bgcolor="#CCFFCC" 
|15||W||November 9, 2005||5–0 || align="left"|  Pittsburgh Penguins (2005–06) ||5–9–1 || 
|- align="center" bgcolor="#CCFFCC" 
|16||W||November 11, 2005||5–2 || align="left"|  Tampa Bay Lightning (2005–06) ||6–9–1 || 
|- align="center" bgcolor="#CCFFCC" 
|17||W||November 12, 2005||9–0 || align="left"| @ Carolina Hurricanes (2005–06) ||7–9–1 || 
|- align="center" bgcolor="#FFBBBB"
|18||L||November 16, 2005||3–7 || align="left"|  New York Islanders (2005–06) ||7–10–1 || 
|- align="center" bgcolor="#CCFFCC" 
|19||W||November 18, 2005||6–5 OT|| align="left"| @ Philadelphia Flyers (2005–06) ||8–10–1 || 
|- align="center" bgcolor="#FFBBBB"
|20||L||November 19, 2005||1–5 || align="left"| @ Toronto Maple Leafs (2005–06) ||8–11–1 || 
|- align="center" 
|21||L||November 22, 2005||2–3 SO|| align="left"| @ Montreal Canadiens (2005–06) ||8–11–2 || 
|- align="center" bgcolor="#FFBBBB"
|22||L||November 24, 2005||3–6 || align="left"|  New York Rangers (2005–06) ||8–12–2 || 
|- align="center" bgcolor="#CCFFCC" 
|23||W||November 26, 2005||7–4 || align="left"|  Florida Panthers (2005–06) ||9–12–2 || 
|- align="center" bgcolor="#CCFFCC" 
|24||W||November 27, 2005||5–2 || align="left"| @ Carolina Hurricanes (2005–06) ||10–12–2 || 
|- align="center" 
|25||L||November 29, 2005||3–4 OT|| align="left"|  Carolina Hurricanes (2005–06) ||10–12–3 || 
|-

|- align="center" bgcolor="#FFBBBB"
|26||L||December 1, 2005||0–4 || align="left"|  Toronto Maple Leafs (2005–06) ||10–13–3 || 
|- align="center" bgcolor="#FFBBBB"
|27||L||December 3, 2005||1–2 || align="left"| @ Mighty Ducks of Anaheim (2005–06) ||10–14–3 || 
|- align="center" bgcolor="#FFBBBB"
|28||L||December 5, 2005||2–5 || align="left"| @ Phoenix Coyotes (2005–06) ||10–15–3 || 
|- align="center" bgcolor="#FFBBBB"
|29||L||December 6, 2005||3–5 || align="left"| @ San Jose Sharks (2005–06) ||10–16–3 || 
|- align="center" bgcolor="#CCFFCC" 
|30||W||December 9, 2005||5–2 || align="left"|  Columbus Blue Jackets (2005–06) ||11–16–3 || 
|- align="center" 
|31||L||December 11, 2005||4–5 SO|| align="left"|  Chicago Blackhawks (2005–06) ||11–16–4 || 
|- align="center" bgcolor="#CCFFCC" 
|32||W||December 13, 2005||7–6 || align="left"|  Detroit Red Wings (2005–06) ||12–16–4 || 
|- align="center" bgcolor="#CCFFCC" 
|33||W||December 15, 2005||3–2 OT|| align="left"| @ New Jersey Devils (2005–06) ||13–16–4 || 
|- align="center" bgcolor="#CCFFCC" 
|34||W||December 17, 2005||2–1 || align="left"|  Florida Panthers (2005–06) ||14–16–4 || 
|- align="center" 
|35||L||December 22, 2005||5–6 SO|| align="left"|  Washington Capitals (2005–06) ||14–16–5 || 
|- align="center" bgcolor="#CCFFCC" 
|36||W||December 23, 2005||1–0 || align="left"| @ New Jersey Devils (2005–06) ||15–16–5 || 
|- align="center" bgcolor="#CCFFCC" 
|37||W||December 26, 2005||4–0 || align="left"|  Montreal Canadiens (2005–06) ||16–16–5 || 
|- align="center" 
|38||L||December 28, 2005||3–4 OT|| align="left"|  Philadelphia Flyers (2005–06) ||16–16–6 || 
|- align="center" bgcolor="#FFBBBB"
|39||L||December 30, 2005||1–4 || align="left"| @ Buffalo Sabres (2005–06) ||16–17–6 || 
|-

|- align="center" bgcolor="#CCFFCC" 
|40||W||January 1, 2006||5–2 || align="left"| @ Washington Capitals (2005–06) ||17–17–6 || 
|- align="center" bgcolor="#CCFFCC" 
|41||W||January 2, 2006||8–3 || align="left"|  Ottawa Senators (2005–06) ||18–17–6 || 
|- align="center" bgcolor="#FFBBBB"
|42||L||January 4, 2006||3–4 || align="left"| @ Carolina Hurricanes (2005–06) ||18–18–6 || 
|- align="center" bgcolor="#CCFFCC" 
|43||W||January 6, 2006||6–4 || align="left"|  Pittsburgh Penguins (2005–06) ||19–18–6 || 
|- align="center" bgcolor="#CCFFCC" 
|44||W||January 7, 2006||4–3 || align="left"| @ Pittsburgh Penguins (2005–06) ||20–18–6 || 
|- align="center" bgcolor="#CCFFCC" 
|45||W||January 11, 2006||4–3 SO|| align="left"|  Nashville Predators (2005–06) ||21–18–6 || 
|- align="center" bgcolor="#CCFFCC" 
|46||W||January 13, 2006||2–0 || align="left"|  St. Louis Blues (2005–06) ||22–18–6 || 
|- align="center" bgcolor="#CCFFCC" 
|47||W||January 18, 2006||5–2 || align="left"| @ Dallas Stars (2005–06) ||23–18–6 || 
|- align="center" bgcolor="#FFBBBB"
|48||L||January 19, 2006||6–8 || align="left"| @ Los Angeles Kings (2005–06) ||23–19–6 || 
|- align="center" bgcolor="#FFBBBB"
|49||L||January 21, 2006||0–2 || align="left"|  Tampa Bay Lightning (2005–06) ||23–20–6 || 
|- align="center" bgcolor="#FFBBBB"
|50||L||January 24, 2006||2–3 || align="left"|  Boston Bruins (2005–06) ||23–21–6 || 
|- align="center" bgcolor="#FFBBBB"
|51||L||January 26, 2006||1–5 || align="left"|  Carolina Hurricanes (2005–06) ||23–22–6 || 
|- align="center" bgcolor="#FFBBBB"
|52||L||January 28, 2006||1–4 || align="left"| @ Carolina Hurricanes (2005–06) ||23–23–6 || 
|- align="center" bgcolor="#FFBBBB"
|53||L||January 31, 2006||2–5 || align="left"|  Buffalo Sabres (2005–06) ||23–24–6 || 
|-

|- align="center" bgcolor="#FFBBBB"
|54||L||February 3, 2006||2–5 || align="left"| @ Florida Panthers (2005–06) ||23–25–6 || 
|- align="center" bgcolor="#CCFFCC" 
|55||W||February 4, 2006||6–4 || align="left"|  Florida Panthers (2005–06) ||24–25–6 || 
|- align="center" bgcolor="#FFBBBB"
|56||L||February 7, 2006||1–4 || align="left"| @ Toronto Maple Leafs (2005–06) ||24–26–6 || 
|- align="center" bgcolor="#CCFFCC" 
|57||W||February 9, 2006||2–1 || align="left"| @ Ottawa Senators (2005–06) ||25–26–6 || 
|- align="center" bgcolor="#CCFFCC" 
|58||W||February 11, 2006||2–1 SO|| align="left"| @ Montreal Canadiens (2005–06) ||26–26–6 || 
|-

|- align="center" bgcolor="#CCFFCC" 
|59||W||March 1, 2006||4–2 || align="left"| @ Buffalo Sabres (2005–06) ||27–26–6 || 
|- align="center" bgcolor="#FFBBBB"
|60||L||March 2, 2006||2–3 || align="left"| @ Boston Bruins (2005–06) ||27–27–6 || 
|- align="center" bgcolor="#CCFFCC" 
|61||W||March 4, 2006||3–2 OT|| align="left"|  Washington Capitals (2005–06) ||28–27–6 || 
|- align="center" bgcolor="#CCFFCC" 
|62||W||March 6, 2006||4–3 SO|| align="left"|  Florida Panthers (2005–06) ||29–27–6 || 
|- align="center" bgcolor="#CCFFCC" 
|63||W||March 8, 2006||3–2 SO|| align="left"|  New York Rangers (2005–06) ||30–27–6 || 
|- align="center" bgcolor="#FFBBBB"
|64||L||March 10, 2006||1–3 || align="left"|  Ottawa Senators (2005–06) ||30–28–6 || 
|- align="center" bgcolor="#CCFFCC" 
|65||W||March 12, 2006||3–2 OT|| align="left"| @ New York Rangers (2005–06) ||31–28–6 || 
|- align="center" bgcolor="#CCFFCC" 
|66||W||March 16, 2006||4–2 || align="left"|  New York Islanders (2005–06) ||32–28–6 || 
|- align="center" bgcolor="#FFBBBB"
|67||L||March 18, 2006||2–4 || align="left"|  Philadelphia Flyers (2005–06) ||32–29–6 || 
|- align="center" bgcolor="#CCFFCC" 
|68||W||March 20, 2006||5–0 || align="left"|  Buffalo Sabres (2005–06) ||33–29–6 || 
|- align="center" bgcolor="#CCFFCC" 
|69||W||March 21, 2006||5–4 SO|| align="left"| @ Boston Bruins (2005–06) ||34–29–6 || 
|- align="center" bgcolor="#CCFFCC" 
|70||W||March 23, 2006||6–5 OT|| align="left"|  New Jersey Devils (2005–06) ||35–29–6 || 
|- align="center" bgcolor="#FFBBBB"
|71||L||March 25, 2006||1–5 || align="left"| @ New York Islanders (2005–06) ||35–30–6 || 
|- align="center" bgcolor="#FFBBBB"
|72||L||March 30, 2006||3–4 || align="left"| @ Tampa Bay Lightning (2005–06) ||35–31–6 || 
|-

|- align="center" bgcolor="#CCFFCC" 
|73||W||April 1, 2006||5–2 || align="left"|  Carolina Hurricanes (2005–06) ||36–31–6 || 
|- align="center" bgcolor="#FFBBBB"
|74||L||April 3, 2006||4–6 || align="left"| @ Ottawa Senators (2005–06) ||36–32–6 || 
|- align="center" bgcolor="#CCFFCC" 
|75||W||April 5, 2006||5–2 || align="left"| @ Florida Panthers (2005–06) ||37–32–6 || 
|- align="center" 
|76||L||April 6, 2006||2–3 SO|| align="left"| @ Tampa Bay Lightning (2005–06) ||37–32–7 || 
|- align="center" bgcolor="#CCFFCC" 
|77||W||April 8, 2006||5–2 || align="left"|  Carolina Hurricanes (2005–06) ||38–32–7 || 
|- align="center" bgcolor="#CCFFCC" 
|78||W||April 11, 2006||6–2 || align="left"| @ Tampa Bay Lightning (2005–06) ||39–32–7 || 
|- align="center" bgcolor="#CCFFCC" 
|79||W||April 13, 2006||5–3 || align="left"|  Washington Capitals (2005–06) ||40–32–7 || 
|- align="center" bgcolor="#CCFFCC" 
|80||W||April 15, 2006||4–3 || align="left"|  Boston Bruins (2005–06) ||41–32–7 || 
|- align="center" bgcolor="#FFBBBB"
|81||L||April 17, 2006||4–6 || align="left"| @ Washington Capitals (2005–06) ||41–33–7 || 
|- align="center" 
|82||L||April 18, 2006||1–2 OT|| align="left"| @ Florida Panthers (2005–06) ||41–33–8 || 
|-

|-
| Legend:

Player statistics

Scoring
 Position abbreviations: C = Center; D = Defense; G = Goaltender; LW = Left Wing; RW = Right Wing
  = Joined team via a transaction (e.g., trade, waivers, signing) during the season. Stats reflect time with the Thrashers only.
  = Left team via a transaction (e.g., trade, waivers, release) during the season. Stats reflect time with the Thrashers only.

Goaltending

Awards and records

Awards

Milestones

Transactions
The Thrashers were involved in the following transactions from February 17, 2005, the day after the 2004–05 NHL season was officially cancelled, through June 19, 2006, the day of the deciding game of the 2006 Stanley Cup Finals.

Trades

Players acquired

Players lost

Signings

Draft picks
Atlanta's draft picks at the 2005 NHL Entry Draft held at the Westin Hotel in Ottawa, Ontario.

Notes

References

Atlanta
Atlanta
Atlanta Thrashers seasons
Atlanta Thrashers
Atlanta Thrashers